The 2018 Los Angeles FC season was the club's inaugural season, and their first season in Major League Soccer, the top-tier of the American soccer pyramid. Los Angeles FC play its home games at the Banc of California Stadium in Exposition Park neighborhood of Los Angeles. Outside of MLS play, LAFC participated in the 2018 U.S. Open Cup tournament, and qualified for the 2018 MLS Cup Playoffs, being eliminated in the knockout round.

It was the first year since 2014 that there were two first-division soccer clubs that played in the Greater Los Angeles Area, following the disbandment of Chivas USA in 2014.

Background 
The team was first announced in October 2014, following the folding of Chivas USA. It was first reported in May 2015, that LAFC had chosen a location for their stadium, which would be the Los Angeles Memorial Sports Arena site at Exposition Park. The environmental impact report, arena demolition and stadium construction were expected to take three years and delayed the team's debut to 2018.

On July 27, 2017, Bob Bradley was announced as the coach for the inaugural season of the club. Bradley previously coached Swansea City in the English Premier League, as well as various European and Americans clubs as well. Internationally, Bradley previously coached the United States' and Egypt's national teams.

Squad

First-team roster

Team management

Technical Staff

Transfers

Transfers in

Transfers out

Draft picks

Competitions

Preseason

Major League Soccer

Standings

Western Conference

Overall

Results 
All times are Pacific.

MLS Cup Playoffs

U.S. Open Cup

Friendlies

Player statistics

Appearances and goals
Last updated on November 1, 2018

|-
! colspan=14 style=background:#dcdcdc; text-align:center|Goalkeepers

|-
! colspan=14 style=background:#dcdcdc; text-align:center|Defenders

|-
! colspan=14 style=background:#dcdcdc; text-align:center|Midfielders

|-
! colspan=14 style=background:#dcdcdc; text-align:center|Forwards

|-
! colspan=14 style=background:#dcdcdc; text-align:center| Players who have made an appearance or had a squad number this season but have left the club

|-
|}

Top scorers 

As of November 2, 2018.

See also 
2018 Orange County SC season

References

External links 
Los Angeles Football Club Official Site

2018
2018 Major League Soccer season
American soccer clubs 2018 season
Los Angeles FC
Los Angeles FC